Mama Lo's was a soul food restaurant located in Gainesville, Florida, United States. It was founded by, operated by, and named for Lorene "Mama Lo" Alexander in 1975. The restaurant closed in 1995. Located only a few blocks from the University of Florida and across the street from a railroad track, the establishment proved popular with students, townsfolk and travelers alike. It was also frequented by many local musicians such as Bo Diddley, Tom Petty and the Heartbreakers, The Stranger Band and Sister Hazel.

UF alumni in the 2000s reminisced about their favorite Mama Lo's servings, such as chicken and rice, broccoli casserole, and sweet tea.  It was said that through the Southern, home-style cooking Mama Lo served to loyal customers for over three decades, she put her four children through college in Gainesville.

Mama Lo's was located at 618 NW 6th Street in Gainesville, Florida.  Lorene "Mama Lo" Alexander died in 2007, at the age of 85.

See also
 List of soul food restaurants

References
 
Southern Food: At Home, on the Road, in History, John Egerton 1993 UNC Press  pp. 75–76
Two for the Road: Our Love Affair With American Food. Houghton Mifflin Harcourt. p. 168.
"Mama Lo Serves Up A Feast in Her Unpretentious Gainesville Cafe". Jane and Michael Stern. Ocala Star-Banner. 12 October 1989.

External links
 Gainesville FL: Is Mama Lo's Still Around? Chowhound.
 Mama Lo's Broccoli Casserole recipe

African-American history of Florida
Economy of Gainesville, Florida
Restaurants in Florida
Defunct restaurants in Florida
Restaurants established in 1975
Soul food restaurants in the United States
1975 establishments in Florida
1995 disestablishments in Florida
Restaurants disestablished in 1995